Me Too! is a British live action educational television programme for preschool children broadcast on BBC Two and CBeebies from September 2006 to March 2007 and is set in the fictional city of Riverseafingal in Scotland, though in reality the programme was filmed in North Berwick, Glasgow, Edinburgh, London, Newcastle upon Tyne and Manchester. The round school in the programme is a real school situated in Gourock, called Gourock Primary School.

Me Too! was produced by Glasgow based production company Tattiemoon. One of the directors is Andrew Agnew, who played PC Plum from Balamory which had the same similarities in concept as Me Too!.

The series
The series follows 6 parents and their children, including Rebecca, Jack, Kai and Lisa, and a dog called Sampson who are apart during the day as the children go to Granny Murray's house and the parents go to work. At various points in the program, the parent will think of their child and a 'think puff' travels across the city to Granny Murray's house, then the child will think of their parent and the 'think puff' will travel back to the parents' work.

The programme then alternates between what the parents are doing a work and what the children are doing with Granny Murray. One of the aims behind the series is to reassure children of working parents who go to childminders that their parents are always thinking of them. In addition, children get a view into an adult's working day.

Each episode's plot hinges on a problem that develops at work and the main character's "race against time" to sort it out. Granny Murray always provides a kernel of wisdom during the programme's opening that helps the problem be solved. The programme features much usage of clocks and time, and hence also aims to teach young children to tell the time.

Main characters

Adults
 Granny Murray (played by Jane McCarry) is the main character of the series. She is a Childminder who takes care of the children who attend her house on Tattiemoon Lane and likes giving advice to the parents, which always saves the day whenever the other adults have their own prediciments. Her two songs, which are played every episode, are the short two-line song "Who's Here" and the faster and upbeat "What Have We Done Today?", which is played at the end of every episode before she delivers a recap on the episode. Her role in the series is similar to that of Miss Hoolie on Balamory.
 Rudi (played by Chris McCausland) is a fruit & veg trader and the father of Jack. He operates a stall on the Riverseafingal Market that sells fruits and vegetables. His song is "The Market".
 Tina (played by Elaine Mackenzie Ellis) is a Taxi Driver and the mother of Lisa. She takes customers in her pink taxi around Riverseafingal, and she is also a theatrical costume and prop hirer when she isn't driving. Her song is "Pretty Pink Taxi". 
 Raymond (played by Matthew McVarish) is a Railway Buffet car manager and the father of Lisa. He operates the Buffet car in the Riverseafingal Trains. His song is "I Love My Train".
 Dr Juno (played by Rosemary Amoani) is a A&E Doctor and the owner of Sampson. She works in the Hospital, mainly in the children's department. Her song is "I'm Rushing Here and There"
 Mickey John (played by Donald McLeary) is a Primary School Teacher and the father of Rebecca. He teaches a class at the local primary school. His song is "School Day, Work Away"
 Bobby (played by Samantha Seager) is a Bus Depot Cleaner and the mother of Kai. She runs the nightshift at the bus depot, making sure the local buses are nice and clean for the next day. Her song is "Bobby Boogie Woogies".

Children/Pets
 Jack (played by Jack McGarril), the son of Rudi.
 Lisa (played by Lisa Irvine), the daughter of Raymond and Tina.
 Rebecca (Rebecca Morrow), the daughter of Mickey John.
 Kai (played by Kai Ross), the son of Bobby.
 Sampson the Dog (Played by Jess the Dog), the pet of Dr Juno.

Recurring Characters
There are many recurring characters seen throughout the series, ranging from children who stay with Granny Murray, and other adults who make frequent appearances.
 Nurse Hendry (played by Ross Allan) is a A&E Nurse who works with Dr Juno in the hospital.
 Chuck (played by Joyce Galugbo) and Louie (played by Michelle Rodley) are Ferryboat Band Musicians who are part of the Ferryboat Band.

Development
On November 7, 2005, the BBC commissioned Tattiemoon to produce the series for a 2006 broadcast.
On February 27, 2006, the first 75 episodes were announced to be broadcast within the fall and winter, with the rest airing during the spring of 2007.

Episodes

Series 1 (2006-07)

Series 2 (2007)
 "Snoring": Bobby is frightened by strange noises in the bus depot but she investigates.
 "Bumped": One of Doctor Juno's patients is not recovering well so she asks Raymond for assistance.
 "Ditched": When Tina's taxi rolls into a ditch she needs assistance to remove it.
 "A Joke Too Far": It is tell-a-joke day and one of Rudi's jokes upsets Doctor Juno.
 "Drawing it Out": Dr Juno has a patient who won't tell her what is wrong.
 "Chilly Day": It is a cold day so Doctor Juno wants to ensures that everyone wraps up warmly.
 "Gadgets": Mickey John gives a talk to his class about Roman gadgets.
 "Thunder": Bobby is scared of the thunderstorm that arrives in Riverseafingal.
 "The Chef": Raymond goes to the continent for a cookery lesson.
 "Chatterbox": Rudi earns money to buy a new jacket for Jack.
 "Taxi Lanes": Tina gets stuck in a traffic jam.
 "Lost": Dr Juno is on a charity bike ride on the continent when her sat nav device starts speaking French.
 "Bird's Eye View": Mickey John is taking his photography group to Bruges and Granny Murray wants to see a bird's eye view of the city.
 "Packed Lunches": Raymond sells new lunchboxes on the train.
 "Birthday Socks": Mickey John wants to show his class how things have changed since he was a boy.
 "Be Seen": Doctor Juno asks Bobby to distribute some leaflets on the buses about night safety.
 "Trollies": Stripey shopping trollies are very popular in Riverseafingal, which causes a bit of a mix-up. However, Rudi solves the problem.
 "Night and Day": Mickey John has problems explaining the difference between night and day to the children.
 "Exotic Fruit": Nobody is interested in the exotic fruit being sold on Rudi's stall.
 "Waiting Room": It is raining and there is a queue for Tina's taxi.
 "Helping Hand": Raymond is working on a train called the Picnic Express and Tina tries to help him.
 "Don't Touch": Doctor Juno gives a talk to Mickey John's class about dangers in the home.
 "Pairs": On a cold day, many people are losing their gloves and scarves.
 "Castles and Knights": Mickey John's guest speaker fails to turn up.
 "The Panto": Raymond has problems getting to Drumtown for his panto because of train problems.
 "Panic" Raymond keeps panicking over the slightest task and then a cat runs loose on the train.
 "Sharing Your Troubles": Doctor Juno's patient does not want to be examined.
 "Weights and Measures": Mickey John teaches his children about weights and measures.
 "Sorting Change": Rudi needs to visit the bank with his change before it closes.
 "Double Booked": Tina has a new booking system for her taxi but forgets to book someone in.
 "The Suitcase": Mickey John returns from his holiday but his suitcase causes problems on the train.
 "Soapy" Bobby does not realise that the bucket she is using to clean the buses is dirty.
 "Clean Corridors": Doctor Juno thought Bobby was wrong that her waiting room was dirty. But turns out Bobby's right and Doctor Juno's wrong.
 "Smelling of Roses": There is a horrible smell coming from Tina's taxi.
 "The Hike": Raymond has nearly run out of food on the train and Mickey John and his cub scouts are hungry.
 "Writing": Mickey John cannot read his classes' stories because he made them write them in a hurry.
 "Celebrity Chef": Rudi has a celebrity chef coming to his stall to do a cooking demonstration.
 "Wedding Car": Tina takes Doctor Juno to a wedding in her taxi.
 "Clever Dog": Sampson stops a child from running out onto the road.
 "Football Special": Everyone on the train, apart from Mickey John, wants to listen to the football match.
 "The Text Paper": Bobby has a lot of forms to fill in at work but does not know if she will have the time to fill them in.
 "Flags": Rudi likes Mickey John's idea that everyone should learn something new every day.
 "Masks": Tina and Raymond perform Cinderella in Bruges. But they brought paper plates instead of hats.
 "Book Sale": Mickey John hosts a book sale to raise funds for the school.
 "Making a Fuss": When Mickey John panics that he has overreacted, Doctor Juno tries to calm him down.
 "Bouncy Day": Riverseafingal hosts a bouncing festival.
 "First Aid": Raymond grazes his arm but his first aid kit is empty.
 "Eyes and Teeth": Mickey John's teeth cleaning campaign needs brightening up.
 "Sunburn": It is a hot day and many people are going to Doctor Juno's hospital with sunburn.
 "Giving": Mickey John is given a fir cone by Rebecca, a picture from Dr Juno and a nature collection from Bobby.
 "The Coffee Machine": Raymond likes his new coffee machine until it stops working.
 "The Burst Water Main": When a water main bursts at Rudi's stall, he has to act fast to move it.
 "Good Advice": Raymond tries to sell crumbles as a snack but people want to buy fruit instead.
 "Pirate Hospital": The children are going to Jordan's party, however he has broken his arm.
 "Chocolate" Raymond and Mickey John visit Bruges to find new recipes for the buffet car. But Raymond forgets to get a treat for Lisa.
 "Spooky Party": Mickey John hosts a Halloween party in his classroom.
 "Comfy": Tina does not realise that the seat in her taxi has burst.
 "Map": Mickey John gives his class a lesson on maps but his class don't find it interesting.
 "Sunshine Fruit": The rain is making everyone feel very glum.
 "Girl on a Bike": Tina feels very nervous about her show.
 "Lost Mop": Bobby is busy working on the buses when she gets distracted and loses her mop.
 "Counting Cows": Tina tells Granny Murray about the cowboy parade.
 "Changing Wheel": Bobby discovers that one of the buses has a flat tyre.
 "Bags Away": It is a windy day and Rudi's bags get blown away from his stall.
 "Smiles and Frowns": Raymond makes a meal and a birthday cake for Rudi and Louie.
 "Jive Times Table": Mickey John is not looking forward to teaching his maths lesson.
 "Auntie's Day Out": Tina takes her aunt on a trip to Bruges.
 "The Pigeon": A pigeon gets stuck in the bus depot.
 "Gymnastic Display": Tina opens Bobby's gymnastic display by performing a scarf dance.
 "The Fete": Granny Murray takes the children and Sampson to the fete.
 "Sorted": Bobby discovers a birthday card has been left on one of her buses.
 "Eat Your Greens": Rudi helps Doctor Juno with a photo shoot to promote healthy eating.

Places
Within Riverseafingal, there are many locations:
 Granny Murray's House (22 Kingsborough Gardens Glasgow, Scotland)
 Castle Market (Edinburgh Farmers' Market)
 The Castle (Edinburgh Castle)
 Harlequin Hospital (The Gherkin)
 Roundhouse Primary School (Gourock Primary School)
 Riverseafingal Bus Depot (Lothian Buses)
 Taxi Garage
 Train Station and Train buffet car (set on a Mk4 Class 91 GNER train)
 The Ferryboat (MS Superfast XI)

Home Media releases
BBC Worldwide released a DVD titled "Welcome to the City!" in July 2008, containing six episodes.

References

External links
 
 
 Me Too! on the BBC website
 online parents'/viewers' discussion
 Tattiemoon production company,email address contact posted

2000s British children's television series
2006 British television series debuts
BBC children's television shows
BBC Scotland television shows
British preschool education television series
Television shows set in Edinburgh
Television shows set in Glasgow
Television shows set in London
Television shows set in Manchester
Television shows set in Newcastle upon Tyne
English-language television shows
CBeebies
Television series by BBC Studios
2000s preschool education television series